Marko Adamović (Serbian Cyrillic: Марко Адамовић; born 11 March 1991) is a Serbian footballer who plays as a midfielder for Doxa Katokopias.

Career
On 11 September 2017, Adamović signed with Bulgarian club Beroe.  In June, he joined Cypriot First Division side AEL Limassol for an undisclosed fee.

References

External links
 
 
 Marko Adamović stats at Utakmica.rs

1991 births
Living people
People from Ub, Serbia
Serbian footballers
Serbia youth international footballers
Association football midfielders
FK Jedinstvo Ub players
FK Spartak Subotica players
FK Rad players
FK Radnički 1923 players
FK Voždovac players
Karmiotissa FC players
Hapoel Ra'anana A.F.C. players
PFC Beroe Stara Zagora players
AEL Limassol players
Serbian SuperLiga players
Cypriot First Division players
Israeli Premier League players
First Professional Football League (Bulgaria) players
Serbian expatriate footballers
Expatriate footballers in Cyprus
Expatriate footballers in Israel
Expatriate footballers in Bulgaria
Serbian expatriate sportspeople in Cyprus
Serbian expatriate sportspeople in Israel
Serbian expatriate sportspeople in Bulgaria